Doom Patrol is a superhero team from DC Comics.  The original Doom Patrol first appeared in My Greatest Adventure #80 (June 1963), and was created by writers Arnold Drake and Bob Haney, along with artist Bruno Premiani.  Doom Patrol has appeared in different incarnations in multiple comics, and have been adapted to other media. The series' creator and fans have suspected that Marvel Comics copied the basic concept to create the X-Men, which debuted a few months later, but other fans speculate that The Doom Patrol was derivative of an even earlier Marvel superhero team, the Fantastic Four.

Doom Patrol are a group of super-powered misfits whose "gifts" caused them alienation and trauma.  Dubbed the "world's strangest heroes"  by editor Murray Boltinoff, the original team included the Chief (Niles Caulder), Robotman (Cliff Steele), Elasti-Girl (Rita Farr), and Negative Man (Larry Trainor); Beast Boy (Garfield Logan) and Mento (Steve Dayton) joined soon after.  The team remained the featured characters of My Greatest Adventure, which was re-titled Doom Patrol as of issue #86 (March 1964).  The original series was canceled in 1968 when Drake killed the team off in issue #121, last of that series, (September–October 1968).  Since then, there have been six Doom Patrol series, with Robotman as the only character to appear in all of them.

Publication history

My Greatest Adventure: Doom Patrol (volume 1)

Doom Patrol first appeared in 1963, when the DC title My Greatest Adventure, an adventure anthology, was being converted to a superhero format. The task, assigned to writer Arnold Drake, was to create a team that fit both of these formats. With fellow writer Bob Haney and artist Bruno Premiani, he created Doom Patrol, a team of super-powered misfits who were regarded as freaks by the world at large. According to Drake, editor Murray Boltinoff told him My Greatest Adventure was in danger of cancellation and he wanted him to create a new feature which might save it. Boltinoff was enthusiastic about Drake's initial pitch with Elasti-Girl and Automaton (changed to Robotman by the team's third appearance, issue #82), but Drake wanted a third character and enlisted Haney's help in coming up with Negative Man.  The team was initially announced as "The Legion of the Strange".

Doom Patrol were announced on the cover art of My Greatest Adventure #80 (cover dated June 1963). Drake and Haney devised the plot for the issue together, and then each scripted half the issue independently (Drake the first half, Haney the second). Doctor Niles Caulder motivated the original Doom Patrol, bitter from being isolated from the world, to use their powers for the greater good. My Greatest Adventure was officially retitled The Doom Patrol beginning with issue #86.

In an interview, Drake discussed the conception of Doom Patrol.

The members of the Doom Patrol often quarrelled and suffered personal problems, something that was already common among superhero teams published by Marvel Comics such as Fantastic Four, but was novel among the DC lineup. Doom Patrol's rogues gallery matched the strange, weird tone of the series. Villains included the immortality-seeking General Immortus, the shape-shifting Animal-Vegetable-Mineral Man, and the Brotherhood of Evil led by the Brain, a disembodied brain kept alive by technology. The Brotherhood of Evil also included the intelligent gorilla Monsieur Mallah and Madame Rouge, who was given powers similar to those of Elongated Man, with the extra attribute of a malleable face, allowing her to impersonate various people.

The Doom Patrol had two crossovers: one with the Challengers of the Unknown, teaming up to fight Multi-Man and Multi-Woman; and second with the Flash in The Brave and the Bold #65.

As the popularity of the book waned, the publisher cancelled it. Drake killed off the entire Doom Patrol in the final issue, Doom Patrol #121 (September–October 1968) where Doom Patrol sacrificed their lives to Madame Rouge and General Zahl to save the small fishing village of Codsville, Maine. This was the first time in comic book history that a cancelled title was concluded with the death of its cast. Artist Bruno Premiani and editor Murray Boltinoff appeared at the beginning and the end of the story, asking fans to write to DC to resurrect Doom Patrol, although the latter was supposed to have been Arnold Drake. According to the writer, he was replaced with the editor because he had just resigned over a pay dispute and moved to Marvel Comics. He finished the script only out of friendship for Boltinoff. A few years later, three more issues appeared, reprints of earlier issues (#89, #95 and #90 appeared as #122, #123 and #124 respectively). A proper Doom Patrol revival did not occur until 1977, nine years after the original's demise.

Some similarities exist between the original Doom Patrol and Marvel Comics' original X-Men; Marvel acknowledged the similarity in its humor title Not Brand Echh. Both include misfit superheroes shunned by society and both are led by men of preternatural intelligence who use wheelchairs. These similarities ultimately led series writer Arnold Drake to argue that the concept of the X-Men must have been based on the Doom Patrol.

Drake stated:

In an interview shortly before his death in 2007, Drake took a more moderate position, stating that while it is possible Lee took his ideas from Doom Patrol, he could also have arrived at a similar concept independently: "Since we were working in the same vineyards, and if you do enough of that stuff, sooner or later, you will kind of look like you are imitating each other." 

The Doom Patrol and the X-Men have many similarities. Both series feature stories that show the protagonists struggling with the mantle of heroism. Both teams are family-oriented with internal problems that are resolved through the aid of other members of the team. And both share some of the same writers such as Grant Morrison and John Byrne. However, while the Doom Patrol tends to go on bizarre and zany adventures, the X-Men tend to be more focused on the themes of racism and prejudice.  

The four lead characters of the original series have much in common with the members of The Fantastic Four. Both teams, composed of a woman and three men, have one member with stretching powers, another with great strength trapped in a distorted or inhuman orange body, and a third whose form seems ablaze with fire or energy. One can extend the comparison by saying that the fourth member is either invisible or behind the scenes. This has inspired fan speculation that The Doom Patrol was inspired by, or imitative of, the earlier series. John Byrne, who has written and drawn all three sets of characters, has written that "I wish someone would ask Arnold Drake about the Doom Patrol's similarities with the Fantastic Four, instead of always bringing up the X-Men comparison."

Showcase: Paul Kupperberg's Doom Patrol
Writer Paul Kupperberg, a longtime Doom Patrol fan, and artist Joe Staton introduced a new team in Showcase #94 (August–September 1977). DC was then lining up features for the Showcase revival—the series was initially an anthology that would debut new characters who could springboard into their own series if they proved sufficiently popular, and Showcase #94 was the first new issue of the series in almost seven years. Editor Paul Levitz instructed Kupperberg and Staton to do a Doom Patrol feature. Kupperberg opted to create a new lineup because he wanted to respect the story in which the Doom Patrol met their deaths, and was inspired by Len Wein and Dave Cockrum's then-recent "all-new, all-different X-Men". Kupperberg has since said he is not proud of the reboot, remarking that "[I was] missing the point of the Doom Patrol. The original group were outsiders and freaks, while my new guys were just comic-book superheroes. I was young and inexperienced and new to writing, with about two years under my belt before getting the gig."

The new team is led by Celsius (Arani Desai), the Chief's previously-unseen wife, who recreates the Doom Patrol to protect herself from General Immortus. Robotman is the only survivor of the original Doom Patrol, and his ruined body is replaced by a new, futuristic one built by Dr. Will Magnus. The Negative Spirit now possesses Russian cosmonaut Valentina Vostok, making her Negative Woman (although its presence does not render her radioactive), and she is able to transform her own body into its form rather than sending it out under control. The final member is Tempest aka Joshua Clay, a Vietnam veteran/deserter who fires energy blasts from his hands.

This new version of the team did not receive its own series following its three-issue tryout. Kupperberg said this was most likely due to poor sales, as even in the months prior to the DC Implosion he heard no word of a new Doom Patrol series. However, the team did receive a series of guest appearances in various DC titles, such as Superman Family (in a three part arc in the Supergirl feature that was intended for the recently canceled Super-Team Family), DC Comics Presents (teaming up with Superman in a story which revealed that Vostok's powers had changed to match Larry Trainor's exactly), and Supergirl. Robotman also appeared as an occasional supporting character in the Marv Wolfman and George Pérez era of Teen Titans, where it was revealed that Changeling, formerly DP associate Beast Boy, had arranged for Dayton Industries technicians to recreate the Caulder body design for Cliff. His first storyline here had him, the Titans, and a new Brotherhood of Evil battle Madame Rouge and General Zahl, the murderers of the original Doom Patrol, who died in the battle.

Eclipse Comics published Doom Patrol: The Official Index with covers drawn by John Byrne in 1984. The two-part series included all of their appearances from My Greatest Adventure #80 to their final appearance before their 1980s return.

Post-Crisis relaunch (volume 2, part 1)
Kupperberg's enthusiasm for the Doom Patrol remained, and in addition to writing some of the team's post-Showcase appearances, he eventually wrote a proposal for a new Doom Patrol series. The proposal was green-lit, and Kupperberg laid the groundwork for the new series by writing the John Byrne-illustrated Secret Origins Annual #1, published in 1987, which recapped the origins of the two iterations of the Doom Patrol that had existed thus far. In October 1987, DC relaunched Doom Patrol, written by Kupperberg and illustrated by Steve Lightle. Lightle took on the assignment with reluctance, having read and disliked Kupperberg's new Doom Patrol in Showcase #94–96, and soon quit due to several grievances, such as not being involved in plotting the comic despite the editor repeatedly promising that he would be. He was replaced by a young Erik Larsen after issue #5. Kupperberg later commented, "I like Erik's work, but I don't think he was exactly right for the Doom Patrol. To tell the truth, I don't think either Erik or myself were happy with the arrangement, but we did our best to make it work." For his part, Larsen said he was perfectly happy on the series, in part because on the few occasions where he disliked an aspect of Kupperberg's plots, he would simply revise the plot when he drew the issue. In retrospect, Larsen felt that this practice was overstepping his bounds, but said the editor never objected to it.

This incarnation was a more conventional superhero series than the original volume. It included new members who were hired to the team: the magnetically empowered strong-girl Lodestone (Rhea Jones); Karma (Wayne Hawking), whose psychic power make anyone trying to attack him fall over themselves; and Scorch (Scott Fischer), whose body generates phenomenal quantities of heat focused through his hands, requiring him to wear protective gloves at all times. A DC Comics Bonus Book appeared in issue #9 (June 1988). According to Kupperberg, sales on the series "started out okay, and descended to the point where I was removed from the book and replaced by Grant Morrison in the hopes he could salvage the title."

Grant Morrison's Doom Patrol (volume 2, part 2)
After the first 18 issues (and various crossovers and annuals), Kupperberg was replaced by Grant Morrison and the comic was no longer submitted to the CCA for approval (relieving the stories and images depicted of several constraints), starting with issue #19. Kupperberg agreed to help Morrison by writing out characters Morrison did not want to use: Celsius and Scott Fischer died before issue #18 - Celsius was killed in an explosion in DC Comics' "Invasion!" event, and Scott Fischer (already suffering from a recurrence of childhood leukemia) was the only known active superhero casualty of the Dominators' gene-bomb (also in "Invasion!"); Karma had left the team as he was still on the run from the law (he became a member of the Suicide Squad and died on his first mission with them in the "War of the Gods" crossover event); the Negative Spirit left Negative Woman's body; and Lodestone plunged into a coma, where she would remain for the first half of Morrison's run on the book. Tempest gave up fieldwork to become the team's physician. Conversely, Morrison picked up a throw-away character from DP #14, who was slipped into the art on the last page of #18 to set up Morrison's use: Dorothy Spinner is an ape-faced girl with powerful "imaginary friends." Morrison also substantially retooled Negative Man: Larry Trainor (revealed to be alive in the Kupperburg run, as a prisoner of an underground society but now powerless) is forcibly merged with the Negative Spirit (now a cosmic entity) and a black doctor named Dr. Eleanor Poole, to create a multigender multiracial gestalt entity known as Rebis. The new writer introduced some new characters to the team, including the multiple personality-afflicted Crazy Jane and sentient neighborhood Danny the Street.

Morrison used DC's Invasion crossover to restart the book. They incorporated bizarre secret societies, elements of Dada, surrealism, and the cut-up technique pioneered by William S. Burroughs and Brion Gysin. They also borrowed the ideas of Jorge Luis Borges and Heinrich Hoffmann. The original creator, Arnold Drake, said Morrison's was the only subsequent run to reflect the intent of the original series.

Over the course of the series, Morrison dedicated some issues to parody and homage. Willoughby Kipling led the Doom Patrol on a parody of the Brujería story arc of Swamp Thing: A Murder of Crows in issues #31–32. Issue #42 featured the origin of Flex Mentallo, who was supposed to be the character in the Charles Atlas ad.  A belated lawsuit from the Charles Atlas Company showed that DC was protected under Fair Use doctrine in addition to an expired statute of limitations. Issue #53 featured a dream sequence that mimicked the Stan Lee/Jack Kirby Fantastic Four, borrowing plot points both from the Galactus Trilogy (FF #48–50) and FF #51, "This Man, This Monster." A 1992 special called Doom Force was released as a one-shot and was meant to mimic and parody the X-Force book by Rob Liefeld. Issue #45 parodied Marvel's Punisher and Alan Moore in a satire called the Beard Hunter, a perpetually clean-shaven serial killer who murders bearded men and targets the Chief.

Morrison's villains were extremely unusual and strange, even by Doom Patrol's eccentric standards. For example:
Red Jack is a near-omnipotent being who thinks he is both Jack the Ripper and God. He lives in a house without windows, torturing butterflies to create the pain he needs to survive.
The Brotherhood of Dada are an anarchistic group who fight against reality and reason. It features members such as Sleepwalk, who can only use her tremendous powers when asleep (she takes sleeping pills and listens to Barry Manilow before battles), and The Quiz, who has "every superpower you hadn't thought of" and a pathological fear of dirt.
The Scissormen, a race of beings that attack non-fictional beings in the "real world" (i.e., the world the Doom Patrol live in) with their large scissor-like hands and cut people out of reality.

In issue #57, it was revealed that the Chief had secretly caused the "accidents" which turned Cliff, Larry Trainor, and Rita Farr into super beings. Chief stated he caused them to gain their powers (or in the case of Robotman, destroyed his original body in order to obtain his brain to put into his robot body) because of his hatred for them. He felt they were spoiled and narcissistic as well as shallow individuals, and that by turning them into "freaks," he could "improve" them as human beings. He further revealed that he lied about not being married to Celsius (the leader of the second Doom Patrol, who Caulder claimed was insane/lying about being married to him) out of anger. He was upset over how the experiments performed on her (like with Elasti-Girl) only gave her super-powers and did not turn her into a freak. When Tempest and Robotman found out his role in "creating" Robotman, Elasti-Girl, and Negative Man, Tempest was killed and Robotman paralyzed. Having been exposed as a villain, Caulder planned to unleash nanobots into the world, hoping to create a catastrophe that would "improve" humanity, regardless of the carnage it would cause. But Caulder's plan was hijacked by the Candlemaker, a violent cosmic horror who is freed by Dorothy in exchange for his resurrection of Tempest (who Candlemaker re-killed). Candlemaker then decapitated Caulder and sought to use the nanobots to enslave humanity. Dorothy, Crazy Jane, and Robotman (freed by the former two) defeated Candlemaker with help from the new reborn version of Rebis. Rebis briefly left the team to mate with a double of himself in order to be "reborn" in a new body as part of a cosmic ritual. However, during the battle, Jane was sent flying into a portal and landed in a world without heroes. Forcibly institutionalized for her mental issues in this new world, the final issue of Morrison's run had Robotman locate Jane as she was about to kill herself and take her to live with Cliff within the confines of Danny the Street.

Rachel Pollack's Doom Patrol (volume 2, part 3)
Morrison left the book with issue #63, and Rachel Pollack took over writing the book the next issue. Pollack's first issue was also the first under the new Vertigo imprint of DC Comics (although the trade paperback editions of Morrison's work do bear the imprint, the original issues did not). Returning characters for Rachel Pollack's run included Cliff Steele, Niles Caulder (kept alive by the nanobots, but reduced to a disembodied head, usually kept on a tray filled with ice), and Dorothy Spinner. Pollack's run had Dorothy as a primary member of the Patrol; she brought her imaginary friends to her aid in combat. Overall, Pollack's run dealt with issues such as the generation gap, humanity, identity, transgender issues, bisexuality, and borrowed elements from Judaism and Kabbalah in the last few issues. The angel Akatriel is used as a major character in the last seven issues.

The first story arc of her run was called "Sliding in the Wreckage". Cliff's computer brain started to malfunction, and he regressed into flashbacks from previous storylines. Dorothy was haunted by African spirits while dealing with living alone in the real world. The Chief was given a new body by Will Magnus, but to atone for his sins, Caulder ripped his head off the body and was kept in cryogenic storage. Meanwhile, the entire Earth had been suffering from random outbreaks of weirdness, contributed by the arrival of something called "The Book of Ice." A government agency known as the Builders, similar to the Men from N.O.W.H.E.R.E., were trying to stop the outbreak, which was apparently linked to a race of shapeshifters known as the Teiresias. As the Chief was kept in a cryogenic state, he appeared in the land of the Teiresias as a face carved in a mountain. They warned him that his arrival in this world was causing the craziness in the real world. Throughout the storyline, little people with backward letters for heads had been seen altering people. These people were apparently older version of nanomachines, referred to as "nannos". At the Doom Patrol headquarters, Builder agents attacked, and in the craziness, two of the Teiresias approached Dorothy with a new brain for Cliff, but to insert it she needed the Chief's expertise. In the Teiresias world, nannos "repaired" the Chief so he could live as a severed head. After his awakening, the craziness seemed to stop, and Dorothy, Cliff, and the Chief each realized that they needed to be together.

The team relocated to Violet Valley's Rainbow Estates, a house haunted by ghosts of those who died in sexual accidents. There, three new members joined. The Bandage People, George and Marion, who were once two workers for the Builders but managed to escape; and the Inner Child, a manifestation of the ghosts' purity and innocence. Another later newcomer of the team was Kate Godwin, aka Coagula, one of the first transgender superheroes. A one-time ally of the team called the Identity Addict, who could become different superheroes by shedding her skin like a lizard, integrated herself back into the team while using the False Memory identity to change the team's memories until she was kicked out by Dorothy.

Villains that the team fought, besides the Builders, included the Fox and the Crow, two animal spirits whose feud Dorothy and Cliff were subsequently pulled into; the Master Cleaner, a being with a human fetus inside a bubble for a head who began "cleaning" the world by stripping it down to nothing and replacing the stolen items, including people, with a paper ticket; and a group of Hassidic healers who called themselves the False Healers and their leader, the Rabbi of Darkness.

Toward the end of the series, Cliff Steele's brain became entirely robotic, until Dorothy Spinner used her imaginary friends to "repair" it. The Chief would later die after trying to enter the Sephirot or Tree of Life.

A new artist, Ted McKeever, took over the artwork for most of the final 13 issues. Pollack continued writing the title until its cancellation with issue #87, in February 1995.

John Arcudi's Doom Patrol (volume 3)
In December 2001, writer John Arcudi and artist Tan Eng Huat launched a new Doom Patrol series. This relaunch was not under the Vertigo imprint and returned the title to the mainstream DC universe. The series lasted for 22 issues before it was cancelled.

Arcudi's run largely ignored Morrison and Pollack's runs at first; Arcudi stated in interviews at the time, that the disconnect with the Vertigo run was due to DC editorial having an agreement in play banning writers from using characters and concepts from his run; most notably Rebis/Negative Man and Crazy Jane. However, due to negative fan response to the run; Arcudi was allowed to make reference to the Vertigo series to explain what had happened to the characters from the Pollack run.

The run featured two Doom Patrols: a corporate run Doom Patrol employed by Thayer Jost for Jost Enterprises featuring existing DC characters (Metamophoro, Elongated Man, the second Doctor Light and Beast Boy) and a second "underground" Doom Patrol, run by Robotman and featuring new characters: Fast Forward who could look 60 seconds into the future, Kid Slick who could become entirely frictionless, Fever who could set herself alight, and Freak who possessed mysterious powers from a patristic entity in her soul. The later Doom Patrol were the main characters of the run, with the Jost owned group disbanding when it is revealed by Metamorpho that Robotman had reportedly died four years earlier which results in the 'imposter' Robotman in the team to vanish into nothingness.

The Doom Patrol later rebuild the real Robotman once they recover his head and come to an agreement that Thayer Jost will fund the group so long as Jost has the distributing rights to the Doom Patrol which he uses to create a Doom Patrol TV series based on the Silver Age Team. Over the course of the run Fast Forward loses control of his powers when he tries to look beyond 60 seconds into the future and has to suppress them with medicine in order to function while Kid Slick and Fever start a relationship with one another despite the latter accidentally hospitalising  the former with her powers. It is later revealed that part of Robotman's agreement with Jost involves Jost funding for Dorothy Spinner's healthcare as she has been in a coma for the last four years, Cliff deduces that the 'imposter' Robotman was an imaginary Cliff that Dorothy had subconsciously manifested.

Visiting Dorothy, Cliff regained his lost memories and how Dorothy became comatose. Deciding to end the Doom Patrol, Coagula and Cliff took Dorothy to Kentucky to meet her previously unknown birth mother to offer Dorothy a chance at a more 'normal' life, but fearing that Coagula and Cliff were abandoning her, Dorothy had an explosive psychic outburst that reportedly killed Coagula and Cliff, and left her comatose. After finding out that Dorothy was permanently brain dead, Cliff gave the doctors permission to turn off her life support. The death of Dorothy ended Robotman's contract with Jost resulting in Fast Forward, Fever, Kid Slick and Freak being evicted and striking out together with royalty money that Jost gave them from his Doom Patrol TV series, while Cliff set off into the world once again alone.

Arcudi's new characters have made very few subsequent appearances, mainly constituting cameos.

John Byrne's Doom Patrol (volume 4)
In August 2004, DC launched a new Doom Patrol series after the new team debuted in JLA. John Byrne wrote and illustrated this series, with inks by Doug Hazlewood. Touted as "Together again for the first time!", Byrne rebooted the series, eliminating all previous Doom Patrol continuity.

The series debuted as part of a six-part storyline that ran in JLA #94–99 as "The Tenth Circle", though Byrne only drew this arc as it was written by Chris Claremont.

This reboot was both controversial and short-lived. Besides the removal of the popular Morrison run (and its characters) from canon and the butterfly effect it had on the Teen Titans  (which did its best to limit references to Beast Boy's past and avoided using the Brotherhood of Evil until the Byrne run was canceled and Geoff Johns could restore the previous lore),the series garnered controversy over a scene where Robotman and Elasti-Girl are sent back in time and inhabit their younger selves' bodies. During their time in the past, Robotman declares his love for Elasti-Girl. However, due to an age gap between the two heroes, Rita is trapped in her twelve-year-old self's body when the adult Cliff reveals his romantic feelings and kisses her. DC canceled Byrne's series with issue #18.

"Infinite Crisis" and "One Year Later"
DC editorial used the events of the "Infinite Crisis" storyline to restore the Doom Patrol's continuity. In escaping from the paradise dimension they had inhabited since the end of Crisis on Infinite Earths, Superboy-Prime and Alex Luthor created temporal ripples which spread throughout reality, causing overlaps on parallel timelines of certain events (Hypertime), such as restoring Jason Todd to life.

In the reprinted edition of Infinite Crisis, additional scenes added to the collection showed Fever, Kid Slick, Ava, Nudge, Grunt, and Vortex among a two-page spread of heroes.

While assisting the Teen Titans in battling Superboy-Prime, members of the Doom Patrol had flashbacks to their original history. Robotman and Niles Caulder regained memories of the previous Doom Patrol teams with which they had worked. This battle apparently undid some of Superboy-Prime's timeline changes and resulted in a timeline incorporating all previous incarnations of the Doom Patrol, but with Rita Farr and Larry Trainor still alive. The Chief confirmed that Rita was indeed killed by Zahl's explosion. The Chief claimed that he later found her skull and treated it with synthetic proteins until her malleable body was regrown from it.

Steve Dayton is again using the Mento helmet and he is mentally unstable; however, he remembers his time as the Crimelord. The Chief appears to be manipulating the Doom Patrol members once again; he claims to wish to return them to normal so "maybe one day [they] won't be freaks anymore." After the Doom Patrol encounters the Titans, the Chief tells them that Kid Devil should be a member of the Doom Patrol instead of the Titans, since his unique appearance and nature will always separate him from others. However, Beast Boy, Elasti-Girl, and Mento all stand up to the Chief and force him to step down as the Doom Patrol's leader, with Mento taking over that role.

Two former members of the Teen Titans were dramatically altered during the course of the "Infinite Crisis". Mal Duncan, now code-named Vox, and his wife (Bumblebee) now reside in the Doom Patrol's castle headquarters.

The Doom Patrol later appear in The Four Horsemen series (2007), with Caulder back in charge. According to Titans (vol. 2) #1, Beast Boy has recently become the team leader.

In DC Universe: Decisions, Robotman has a supporting role while Mento appears in issue #4.

Keith Giffen's Doom Patrol (volume 5)
On February 7, 2009, it was announced at the New York Comic Con that Keith Giffen would be spearheading a revival of Doom Patrol, a title which he has long said he wanted to write. He was joined by artist Matt Clark, who has also long expressed a desire to work on the team. The new series focused on the core members Elasti-Girl, Negative Man, Robotman, and the Chief, while other members such as Mento, Bumblebee, and Vox were to be seen later. The title launched with a 10-page ongoing Metal Men co-feature written by J. M. DeMatteis.

In the first issue, Rita takes on the alias "Elasti-Woman", and according to the team shrink, she's "mothering" Bumblebee, who's now eight inches tall after being shrunk—rather conveniently for her codename—to the size of a bee in Infinite Crisis.

Nudge, Byrne's addition to the team, was killed in the line of duty and Grunt took off with her corpse.

The current team is working out of Oolong Island (from 52), which has been turned into a resort town while still maintaining a large super-science background. The Challengers of the Unknown's Rocky Davis is also working closely with the team for spiritual support.

Former member Crazy Jane appears in issue #7. Danny the Street, in a reduced aspect, appears in issue #8.

Ambush Bug joined the team at the end of issue #9.

The series was canceled, due to a decrease in sales, with issue #22 in May 2011.

The New 52
In September 2011, The New 52 rebooted DC's continuity. In this new timeline, the Doom Patrol is briefly mentioned in issue #24 of Justice League. The team is depicted to be identical in appearance to Paul Kupperberg's 1977 Doom Patrol, consisting of members Celsius, Joshua Clay, and Negative Woman, with additional members Karma and Scott Fischer.

During the "Forever Evil" storyline, Valentina Vostok, Karma, and Scott are killed during a confrontation with Johnny Quick and Atomica of the Crime Syndicate, while Celsius and Joshua Clay are presumably killed. Upon learning of his team's demise, Doctor Niles Caulder sets about assembling a new Doom Patrol.

Following the defeat of the Crime Syndicate, the newly created Doom Patrol is introduced in issue #30 of Justice League. The team includes Robotman, Elasti-Girl, Negative Man and M.I.A. Justice League member Element Woman, whom Caulder refuses to let leave the group and tricks into thinking she was abandoned by the Justice League.

The team attempt to capture Jessica Cruz, the new Power Ring, to force her to join the team. During their attempt to capture her, Caulder demands the team refuse to save civilians in a collapsing building to allow him to lobotomize Cruz and force her to serve him. The Justice League save the people in the building and Lex Luthor manages to hold Caulder back so Batman can convince Cruz to go with the League instead. During their fight, Luthor reveals that Caulder (as he did in the Morrison run) was responsible for causing the "accidents" that gave the Doom Patrol their powers and that both Celsius and Joshua Clay used the chaos of the events of Forever Evil to fake their deaths and escape from Caulder. It is also revealed that Caulder poisoned an entire fishing village as part of an experiment, and cured the residents only after Luthor discovered the truth and threatened to expose him.

Gerard Way's Doom Patrol (volume 6)
A new Doom Patrol series written by Gerard Way and drawn by Nick Derington was created as part of the Young Animal imprint. The first issue was published on September 14, 2016. The series has created a multitude of original characters as well as some taken from former team rosters.

Casey Brinke, a fictional character that Danny The Street created in order to communicate with people through comic books, was contacted by Danny when he became threatened by a group of aliens known as Vectra. They wished to profit from his power to create life by turning his fictional people into cheap meat at a fast food restaurant. Danny reached out to Casey, hoping that she could find and join the Doom Patrol after explaining her origin story, both the fictional origin story he had created for her and how she had become a real person.

Casey agreed to help. She piloted Danny, currently taking the form of an ambulance, into his attackers' headquarters, discovering that the leader of the organization was none other than her fictional father Torminox, accidentally brought to life when Vectra had tortured Danny. Alongside Torminox was an evil version of Casey, known as Doodle Bug. She was also created when Danny was tortured and reflects his concern regarding how Casey would become in the real world. Despite the family drama, Casey and the Doom Patrol defeated Vectra and freed Danny from Vectra's clutches.

Afterward, the team sets out to find Crazy Jane, who was running a cult under the influence of her current dominant ego Dr. Harrison. Harrison wished to purge the 63 other personalities within Jane's mind by distributing them among the mind-controlled cult members using a gene bomb. After the process, she would kill them all. Jane and the team managed to stop this plan and save the cult members while also killing the Dr. Harrison personality within Jane.

The team is contacted by Niles Caulder in a later issue and embark on a mission with him leading. The mission goes haywire and it is revealed that Niles Caulder is gambling again, leading the team to evict him as a leader and as a member of the team. This marks the team embracing being a new iteration of the Doom Patrol.

Doom Patrol: Weight of the Worlds

First published in July 2019, Doom Patrol: Weight of the Worlds retained the oversight of Gerard Way's Young Animal imprint, and directly continued from the ending of Volume 6. The series saw the return of Elasti-Girl and Mento to the team and a brief appearance of Beast Boy. The plot primarily concerned Cliff Steele acquiring a new robot body that was ever upgrading to the point that he became an entire planet in an attempt to protect the universe from hurt, motivated by his mother disowning him and the loss of Dorothy Spinner.
Cliff was eventually persuaded to stop by Crazy Jane who helped to deconstruct him into an infantile form.
The series was cancelled in October 2019 and came to a conclusion with its seventh issue in July 2020.

Infinite Frontier
Following the cancellation of their series, Robotman, Elasti-Girl, and Negative Man were reintroduced to the main DC continuity, alongside Niles Caulder, in issue #1 of Batman/Superman: World's Finest. The team helped the titular superheroes defeat Metallo and later performed surgery on Superman in order to cure him from red kryptonite poisoning.

Unstoppable Doom Patrol
The six-issue Unstoppable Doom Patrol series by writer Dennis Culver, artist Chris Burnham, and colorist Bruan Reber launches March 28, 2023.

Enemies
See List of Doom Patrol enemies

Over the years, The Doom Patrol have fought various Enemies such General Zahl, General Immortus, Brotherhood of Evil, Mr. Nobody, Garguax, Shrapnel, Red Jack, Vincent Harding, Darren Jones, The Scissor Men, Mutant Master, Black Vulture, The Claw, AVM etc.

Other versions

Tangent Comics
In 1997, DC released the Tangent Comics series of books, built on the premise of a world that diverged from the mainstream following the events of the Cuban Missile Crisis. The series featured characters with the same names as mainstream DC characters but were otherwise unrelated to them. The series included a one-shot Doom Patrol title. This Doom Patrol consisted of four heroes: Doomsday, Star Sapphire, Firehawk, and Rampage. The heroes traveled back in time from 2030 to 1997 to prevent Earth's destruction. The Tangent books were later integrated into the DC Multiverse (as Earth-9) as part of the events of Infinite Crisis.

Just Imagine...
In Stan Lee's Just Imagine..., a version of the Doom Patrol appeared as villains under the Reverend Darrk, as three death row criminals are under his son Adam's control later on against the JLA. They consisted of crime boss Brock Smith/Blockbuster, serial killer Lucinda Radama/Parasite, and criminal Deke Durgan/Deathstroke.

Collected editions

My Greatest Adventure/Volume 1
Drake and Premiani's run is available in color as:

It is available in black and white Showcase editions as well:

An omnibus collecting the entire run was also released.

Issues #122–124 of Doom Patrol are reprinted material.

Volume 2

Volume 2-related miniseries

Volume 4

Volume 5
The Keith Giffen written Doom Patrol has been collected in the following trades:

A third collection, titled Fire Away containing issues #14–22, was originally scheduled but never released.

Volume 6
The sixth volume of Doom Patrol, written by Gerard Way, is published under DC's Young Animal Imprint, headed by Way.

In other media

 Due to the success of The Superman/Aquaman Hour of Adventure, Filmation had produced and planned pilots for multiple DC heroes in the hopes of jump starting a DC Comics cartoon hour, with one of the concept drawings featuring the Doom Patrol. However, the plans were cancelled when CBS secured the animation rights to Batman in the wake of ABC's recent success with the live-action Batman television series at the time.
 The Doom Patrol appear in the Teen Titans two-part episode "Homecoming", consisting of Mento, Negative Man, Robotman, and Elasti-Girl. Additionally, Beast Boy was also a member of the team before he left and eventually joined the Teen Titans.
 The Doom Patrol appears in the Batman: The Brave and the Bold episode "The Last Patrol!", consisting of the Chief, Elasti-Girl, Negative Man, and Robotman. This version of the team operated years prior until they failed to save a hostage amidst General Zahl's invasion of Paris and disbanded. In the present, Batman helps the Doom Patrol come out of retirement when Zahl forms an alliance with the rest of the Doom Patrol's enemies to seek revenge. While Batman defeats Zahl and his alliance, the Doom Patrol sacrifice themselves to save the town of Codsville, whose residents rename their town to "Four Heroes" in their memory.
 The original Doom Patrol appear in a self-titled segment of DC Nation Shorts, consisting of the Chief, Elasti-Girl, Negative Man, and Robotman.
 The Doom Patrol appear in Teen Titans Go!, consisting of the Chief, Robotman, Elasti-Girl, and Negative Girl. Similarly to the Teen Titans series, Beast Boy was also a member before he joined the Teen Titans.
 The Doom Patrol appear in a self-titled episode of Titans, consisting of the Chief, Elasti-Woman, Robotman, and Negative Man.
 The Doom Patrol appear in the Young Justice: Outsiders episode "Nightmare Monkeys", consisting of the Chief, Mento, Elasti-Girl, Robotman, Negative Woman, and Beast Boy. This version of the team, barring Mento, Beast Boy, and Robotman, were all killed while on a mission years prior.
 The Doom Patrol appear in a self-titled TV series, consisting of the Chief, Robotman, Negative Man, Elasti-Woman, Jane, and Cyborg. Additionally, a 1950s incarnation of the team appears in the episode "Doom Patrol Patrol", consisting of the Chief, Mento, Joshua Clay, Arani Desai, and Rhea Jones.
 The present-day Doom Patrol also make a cameo appearance in the Arrowverse crossover "Crisis on Infinite Earths" via archive footage of a deleted scene from a season one episode.

See also
 List of Doom Patrol members
 List of Doom Patrol enemies

References

 Callahan, Timothy (2007) Grant Morrison: The Early Years. Masters of the Medium. Sequart Research & Literacy Organization.

External links
 Doom Patrol at the DC Database Project
 Doom Patrol at Don Markstein's Toonopedia. Archived from the original on April 22, 2016.
 
 
 
 
 
 
 
Waiting For Doom fan made podcast, reviewing all issues of the Doom Patrol

 
DC Comics titles
DC Comics franchises
Comics characters introduced in 1963
1987 comics debuts
Comics by Grant Morrison
Comics by J. M. DeMatteis
Comics by John Byrne (comics)
Comics by Paul Kupperberg
Characters created by Bob Haney
Characters created by Arnold Drake
Comics by Gerard Way
Transgender-related comics
Comics adapted into television series